Horsfieldia carnosa is a plant species in the family Myristicaceae. It is a tree endemic to Borneo.

References

carnosa
Endemic flora of Borneo
Trees of Borneo
Near threatened flora of Asia
Taxonomy articles created by Polbot